Tillières-sur-Avre is a commune in the Eure department and Normandy region of northern France.

In 1013, Richard II of Normandy erected a castle on the benches of the Avre river as this region was being contested by the Norman dukes, the counts of Blois and the French kings. The custody of the castle was given to the Raoul from the house of Tosny but some time after his rebellion it was given by Robert I of Normandy to Gilbert I of the house of Crispin. Around 1041 the castle was captured from him and razed by the French king Henry I but Robert's son, William the Conqueror, rebuild the castle and invested Gilbert's son, Gilbert II, as hereditary custodian of the castle around 1058. 

In the same time, the 11th century, its church Saint-Hilaire was build in the Romanesque style. The church was later enlarged in the 16th century and the facade significantly altered in the 19th century.

The painter Maurice Boitel was born here in 1919.

The village is twinned with that of Wendehausen in Thuringia, Germany.

Population

See also
Communes of the Eure department

References

Communes of Eure